The Technical School Certificate is a Vocational Matriculation certificate in Pakistan.

Technical School Certificate is awarded to the students aged 13–14 years old in grade 9 and 10 after finishing Vocational education in Vocational schools in Pakistan.
It is equivalent to the Secondary School Certificate.

See also
 Secondary School Certificate
 Vocational education
 Vocational school
 Jinnah Polytechnic Institute
 Ahmad Hassan Polytechnic Institute
 Institute of technology

References

External links
 Technical and Vocational Education in Pakistan
 Technical School Certificate

Vocational education in Pakistan
School qualifications of Pakistan